The  is an annual set of music awards presented in Japan. It is sponsored by All-Japan CD Shop Clerks Union and awarded based on votes by CD shop clerks from all over Japan. It is referred to as a "music edition of Japan Booksellers' Award".

Abstract 
There is a problem that, there are many high quality Japanese songs are underappreciated and not popular enough. To solve this problem, the CD  shop clerks from whole country built this award to recommend music for guests. All Japanese CD shop clerks could vote via internet, mobile phone and fax. In the first round, everybody could recommend three albums, top20 albums could go into second round. And the voter would vote three of them and determine the final results.
Frome 2019, the award set "red" and "blue" of Grand Prix, while "blue" is awarded for new artist.

Winners

Japanese music

Grand Prix

2015 
The albums nominated for the 2015 Grand Prix after the first half of 2014 were:
 Overtone by Keytalk
 Minna Normal by Gesu no Kiwami Otome
 Namate Odorō by Shintarō Sakamoto
 Shiori by Shiori Niiyama
 Makunōchi ISM by Pasupie
 Love Story by Back Number
 Babymetal by Babymetal
 Tales of Purefly by Man with a Mission
 Yankee by Kenshi Yonezu

The albums nominated for the 2015 Grand Prix after the end of 2014 are:
 Sen'nō, by Yasuko Ōmori
 Amazing Sky, by Rina Katahira
 Fake World Wonderland, by Kinoko Teikoku
 The Pier, by Quruli
 Miryoku ga Sugoi yo, by Gesu no Kiwami Otome
 Magic Number, by go!go!vanillas
 Hi Izuru Tokoro, by Ringo Sheena
 Himatsubushi, by Team Syachihoko
 First Album, by Tofubeats
 Hello, by Happy

Sub-Grand Prix (runner up)

Best Newcomer Award 
Awarded from the sixth CD Shop Awards.

Western music 
Awarded from the second CD Shop Awards, which was the only time when there were a Grand Prix and a Sub-Grand Prix. Since the third Awards, there have been no divisions.

References

External links 
 Official website of All-Japan CD Shop Clerks Union
 

Awards established in 2009
2009 establishments in Japan
Japanese music awards